The 1929 Chatham Cup was the seventh annual nationwide knockout football competition in New Zealand.

The competition was run on a regional basis, with six regional associations (Auckland, Wellington, Poverty Bay, Manawatu, Canterbury, and Otago) each holding separate qualifying rounds.

Electric Soccer 
Blandford Park held Auckland's first Chatham Cup match under electric lighting in 1929. The first round fixture between Auckland Thistle and YMCA (Auckland) in extra time, was completed under floodlighting. On 12 June, in a second round fixture, Northcote were scheduled for an evening kick off against Thistle at Blandford Park at 7:30pm, though due to bad weather the match was rescheduled to take place on 19 June, and again was postponed due to the weather.

On 26 June the match was again postponed due to the state of Blandford Park. Finally on the evening of 3 July the match took place, with Thistle defeating Northcote 3–2.

Teams

Otago 
Seacliff

Canterbury 
Christchurch Thistle, Nomads, Rangers, Western, St. Albans, New Brighton A.F.C.

Wellington 
Hospital, Institute Old Boys'

Hawkes Bay

Manawatu 
St Andrew's, Palmerston North Returned Services Association (R.S.A.)

Poverty Bay 
Gisborne Thistle

Auckland 
Auckland F.A: Tramways, YMCA (Auckland), Celtic (Auckland), Auckland Thistle, Ponsonby, Onehunga, Bon Accord, Auckland Corinthians, Manurewa, Belmont, Rangers (Auckland)

South Auckland F.A:

North Auckland F.A:

The 1929 final
Seacliff's George Anderson, Bill Rogers, Bill Murray, and Bill Hooper were each playing in their fourth final, at that time record. Unfortunately for them, Tramways totally dominated the final. The only goal of the first half came from Clem Bell, though Seacliff came close to equalising before the break. In the second half, though, Seacliff were outclassed. Early on in the half Seacliff keeper T. Jackson managed to get a hand to a shot from F. Lewis but was unable to keep the ball for entering the goal (some sources name Evan Williams was the scorer of this goal). Harry Spencer added two more goals for the Aucklanders, but there was controversy when no penalty was awarded for a clear handball by a defender in front of the Tramways goal late in the match.

Results

Quarter-finals

Semi-finals ("Island finals")

*YMCA "faded out after leading 1-0 when the half-time whistle sounded", according to the report

Final
Teams

Tramways: Jack Batty, J. McElligott, Ernie Simpson, Jack Tinkler, Jim Christie, Joe Fyvie, A. Spong, Clem Bell, Harry Spencer, Evan Williams, F. Lewis.

Seacliff: T. Jackson, George Anderson, Bill Rogers, Bill Murray, Hugh Munsie, A. Maxwell, J. McLaughlan, W. Simmons, Bill Hooper, Tom McCormack, Rab McLean.

References

Rec.Sport.Soccer Statistics Foundation New Zealand 1929 page

Chatham Cup
Chatham Cup
Chatham Cup